The Master of the Golden Altar was a German painter, active in the area around Lüneburg during the fifteenth century. His name is derived from an altarpiece dating most likely to 1418, formerly in St. Michael's church in Lüneburg and now held by a museum in Hanover.

15th-century German painters
Golden Altar, Master of the